Susan Frykberg (born 10 October 1954) is an electroacoustic composer and a sound artist.  She also composes acoustic music in a variety of genres.

Life
Susan Frykberg was born in Hastings, New Zealand, and studied at the University of Canterbury and the University of Otago, studying under, among others, John Rimmer, Barry Vercoe, Barry Conyngham, and Iannis Xenakis. She moved to Canada in 1979 and worked as a free-lance composer in Toronto until a move to Vancouver in 1986, to complete a master's degree at 
Simon Fraser University with Barry Truax. She would teach in the School of Communication at Simon Fraser University for 7 years. 

She served as a guest lecturer at the Ontario College of Art Toronto), Emily Carr College (Vancouver), Auckland University, RMIT University (Melbourne), and Box Hill Institute of TAFE (Melbourne). She has one son.

Works
Frykberg composes electroacoustic works. Selected compositions include:
Mother Too
Insect Life
Birth/Rebirth Bearing Me
Audio Birth Project
Margaret
Astonishing Sense
I Didn’t Think Much About It
Sue and Kathy Telecompose across the Country

Her works have been recorded and issued on media including:
Astonishing Sense Of Being Taken Over By Something Greater Than Me (CD) Earsay Productions, 1998
Transonances (Cass, Ltd) Underwhich Audiographics, 1984
harangue I (CD) Earsay, 1998

References

1954 births
Living people
20th-century classical composers
New Zealand music teachers
Women classical composers
New Zealand classical composers
21st-century classical composers
Women music educators
20th-century women composers
21st-century women composers